Gumnut can refer to:
The hard woody fruit of trees of the genus Eucalyptus.
Snugglepot and Cuddlepie, the gumnut babies of author May Gibbs.